The UAAP Season 71 men's basketball tournament is the 2008-09 season of the University Athletic Association of the Philippines (UAAP) Basketball Championship, with University of the Philippines, Diliman as the season host, to coincide with the centennial celebrations of the University of the Philippines System.

The Ateneo Blue Eagles swept their archrivals De La Salle Green Archers in two games to clinch their first UAAP title since 2002, and to give head coach Norman Black his first collegiate championship. Ateneo's Rabeh Al-Hussaini was named Most Valuable Player (MVP) of the season, while Nonoy Baclao was named as the Finals MVP. Ryan Buenafe won the Rookie of the Year honors, also for the Ateneo.

Teams

Preseason
Aboy Castro succeeds Joe Lipa as the new head coach of the UP Fighting Maroons, after Lipa led his team to a 0–14 record in Season 70. Castro was an assistant coach of Glenn Capacio for the FEU Tamaraws, and of Chot Reyes for the Philippines men's national basketball team, the San Miguel Beermen and Talk 'N Text Phone Pals.

Elimination round
Newly crowned World Boxing Council lightweight and super featherweight champion Manny Pacquiao and Washington Wizards player Gilbert Arenas attended the July 6 games featuring host UP against NU and the Ateneo-La Salle game. Pacquiao was given Sports Excellence award by the UAAP Board while Arenas was on town on a promotional tour.

On July 24, 2008 FEU player Marnel "Mac" Baracael was shot and critically wounded near the FEU campus. The assailant used a caliber .45 pistol with a silencer. Baracael is now in stable condition; police speculate that the shooting maybe basketball-related. Baracael suited up for the Tamaraws in their game against NU, August 28, 2008.

Team standings

Schedule

Results

Postseason teams

Ateneo Blue Eagles
Ateneo opened the season against La Salle, eking out a six-point win 79-73. After an easy win against Adamson, the Eagles were taken to the edge by UE before winning. They won two more games until the sixth game against FEU. The Tamaraws seized the initiative in the endgame to deal Ateneo their first and only loss of the season even with Rabeh Al-Hussaini scoring half of Ateneo's 66 points. Ateneo won the next six games, including a close game versus UST, and an overtime win against UE in which Ryan Buenafe did the heroics over two UE centers, and a rout against NU, the last of which clinched them the twice to beat advantage in the semifinals. In the elimination round finale against the Green Archers they never let La Salle lead, en route to a 65-57 win against their arch-rivals. The 13-1 league leading Blue Eagles faced the 9-5 UE Red Warriors in the semifinals, and ended the fourth seed team's season, with a 70-50 win.

De La Salle Green Archers
After losing their first game against the Eagles, La Salle won five consecutive games. UE gave La Salle their second loss but La Salle won their next game also against the Red Warriors. La Salle won their next three games but lost to FEU. With head coach Franz Pumaren out of the country coaching the under-18 team in the FIBA Asia Under-18 Championship 2008, La Salle prevented overtime with a buzzer-beating put-back for the win against UST, and an overtime win against Adamson to ensure a semifinals berth. Pumaren returned to the country with still a game left at the U-18 tournament to coach the game against league-leading Ateneo Blue Eagles, which would be crucial for them to clinch the twice to beat advantage, even with FEU losing their final elimination game against UE, they lost the game against the Eagles. La Salle's leading scorer in Jvee Casio was being guarded well by the Eagles ended up having a nightmare game, sinking only two field goals out of 17 from the field. The Archers then won two straight games against FEU in the semifinals, thus eliminating the Tamaraws and going to the Finals.

FEU Tamaraws
FEU survived their game against Adamson with a three-pointer to save the game for them. La Salle defeated them but they won their next two games against UP and UST. However, starting power forward Marnel "Mac" Baracael was shot outside school premises that caused him to be sidelined. In their next game against UE, FEU had a rally in the fourth quarter to give them an emphatic win. Riding their three-game winning streak, the Tamaraws defeated the Eagles as they held off the Eagles in the waning minutes of the fourth quarter.

Just after they've won against the #1 team, the #8 team NU upset the Tamaraws who were then tied with three teams for #1. A sorry loss against Ateneo gave them their first losing streak, but an easy win against Adamson and a come from behind overtime win against UST put them back on track. With wins against La Salle, NU and UP, FEU clinched a semifinals berth. They will fight for a playoff game for the twice to beat advantage vs. La Salle since La Salle was beaten by Ateneo in the elimination round finale.

UE Red Warriors
Coming off a 14-0 elimination round sweep last year, UE continued their dominance of the elimination round with wins against UST and NU. However, fellow undefeated team Ateneo handed them their first defeat of the season. A shock loss against Adamson gave them their first elimination round losing streak in a year. Although they've won against cellar dweller UP, the loss against FEU placed them at .500. In a rematch of 2007 Finals, UE got some sort of vengeance as the defeated La Salle, but the Archers got payback as they met each other again four days later.

With wins against doormats UP and NU, UE gave Ateneo another dogfight but they came up short in overtime. Avenging their first round loss against Adamson, UE eliminated UST despite giving up their 24-point lead in the fourth quarter to clinch their semifinals berth.

Second-seed playoff
La Salle and FEU ended tied for second; as a result, a playoff was held to determine which team will clinch the #2 seed and the twice-to-beat advantage that goes along with it, leading to a de facto first game of a best-of-three series.

Bracket

Semifinals
La Salle and Ateneo have the twice-to-beat advantage. They only have to win once, while their opponents, twice, to progress.

Ateneo vs. UE

With UE staying put in the first quarter, Ateneo marked a 16-0 rally late in the first that turned a 5-11 deficit to a 25-13 advantage late in the second quarter. Eric Salamat anchored the run, scoring nine points in that stretch. Freshman Ryan Buenafe's hard drive to the basket erected the Eagles' largest lead at 56-28. The Warriors managed to cut down the lead to twenty but the final deficit was good enough for the third-largest winning margin in Final Four history.

La Salle vs. FEU

Although the Tamaraws led for much of the game, La Salle came from behind to lead 64-62 with 35.2 remaining in the fourth quarter. Marnel "Mac" Baracael missed two free-throws that would've tied the game. After James Mangahas split his charities after a foul in the ensuing rebound play, Paul Sanga missed a desperation three-pointer. The rebound went to La Salle which capitalized with a fastbreak led by Mangahas to settle the final score and their second-consecutive Finals appearance.

Finals
Prior to the finals, the National Bureau of Investigation (NBI) nabbed six ticket scalpers in the Araneta Coliseum for selling outrageously priced tickets. Both head coaches agreed that the officiating in the finals be fair and consistent. UAAP Commissioner Chito Narvasa has already listed 12 referees directly under his management for the series. La Salle head coach Franz Pumaren further remarked that the host school can prevent scalping if it helps in the accounting of tickets; the tickets for the first game were already sold out a week prior to the game.

Meanwhile, security was tight at the Araneta Coliseum to prevent petty thieves from infiltrating the event. However, the security wasn't able to prevent thievery as members of the "Salisi (theft) Gang" were able to steal several items inside the coliseum at the first game.

Game 1

Ateneo opened the scoring with a strong first quarter, but La Salle caught up with them to cut the lead to three. La Salle then went on to lead, 29-26 off Casio's three-point play, but the Eagles launched a 10-0 run to lead at the half despite Chris Tiu, Eric Salamat and Nonoy Baclao spending time on the bench thanks to foul trouble. Rabeh Al-Hussaini had a monster second half, holding back a La Salle rally that cut the lead to six care of JV Casio and Bader Malabes as he scored Ateneo's next eight points to put the game away from the Archers for a game 1 victory.

Game 1 tickets with a face value of P350 were being sold online for P50,300, and some bought tickets from scalpers for P25,000 for the same face value.

Game 2

Finals Most Valuable Player: 

La Salle started the game with an 8–3 scoreline, capped by a Simon Atkins three-pointer. Ateneo came back with their own 24–9 run to hold the lead 27–17 despite Al-Hussaini riding the bench with two personal fouls. Ateneo closed out the first half with another 8-0 run to lead 41-26. JV Casio cut the lead to three points in a 21-9 run that included six three-pointers by the third quarter. However, Rico Maierhofer was ejected from the game for incurring a second technical for flashing the dirty finger, but he claimed he was instructing a teammate to defend using the index finger. La Salle wasn't able to hold on, and Al-Hussaini scored all of his seven points in the third quarter to lead the Ateneo counter-attack. Things got exacerbated when Casio fouled out with 2:48 remaining. Ateneo had a 10-4 run in the final minutes, capped by a three-point play by Jai Reyes to clinch their fourth UAAP title.

La Salle coach Franz Pumaren lambasted the officials saying "It's like a script, you know the ending. They should have just given the trophy right away." He further said that the officiating was "the worst" he has ever seen "in the Finals". Maierhofer was in tears as he walked towards the dugout; La Salle was called for 29 fouls, awarding Ateneo 28 free-throws of which they converted 18.

Ateneo's Nonoy Baclao was named Most Valuable Player of the finals after being the anchor of the Ateneo defense. Baclao scored eight points, grabbed 10 rebounds and blocked five shots in game 2 after scoring seven points, grabbing 7 rebounds and blocking 7 shots, including a crucial block to Maierhofer, in game 1.

Awards

The season's awardees were awarded on a ceremony prior to Game 2 of the finals at the Araneta Coliseum. They are:
Most Valuable Player: 
Rookie of the Year: 
Mythical Five:
 
 
 
 
 
PSBank Maasahan Award: 
KFC Court Colonel: 
Smart Defensive Player Award: 
Jollibee Champ award (top scorer): 
Appeton Most Improved Player: 
Tokyo Tokyo All-Rookie Team:
  
 
 
 
 
Head and Shoulders Crucial Stop:  (last 2 minutes in their Final Four game vs. FEU)

Controversies

ID controversy 
After the Ateneo's first round defeat of La Salle, La Salle coach Franz Pumaren contested the technical given to him for not wearing his ID; previously, UST coach Pido Jarencio wasn't issued a technical when he wasn't wearing his ID. Pumaren labeled this as "selective officiating."  La Salle elevated the issue to the UAAP Board but refused to label it as a "protest". Jarencio for his part said that he is willing to accept any sanctions for not wearing his ID, including two technical free throws in their next game.

As a result of the controversy, Commissioner Narvasa suspended the three referees officiating in the Ateneo-La Salle game for one game for "losing control of the ballgame." La Salle's league representative welcomed the sanctions "but the sanction is for poor officiating; it has nothing to do with the technical foul called."

Suspension of referee
Another referee was suspended indefinitely  by the National Amateur Basketball Referees Organization (NABRO, the organization handling the league referees) after the July 12 La Salle-FEU game. Bryan Tabañag made several errant calls that "deprived FEU a fair chance to determine who the better team was," according to NABRO president Rolando Omampo. Tabañag is NABRO's vice-president.

Despite the referee's suspension, the La Salle-FEU game won't be replayed.

See also
2008 Philippine Collegiate Championship

References

71
2008–09 in Philippine college basketball
UAAP Season 71